Bring It On is the fourth studio album by American country music singer Kevin Fowler. It was released on September 25, 2007, on Equity Music Group. It is also his second and final album for Equity, due to the closure of the label in December 2008. Three singles were released from this album: "Long Line of Losers", "Best Mistake I Ever Made", and "Cheaper to Keep Her". While "Best Mistake I Ever Made" peaked at #47 on the Hot Country Songs chart, the other two singles failed to chart at all. "Long Line of Losers" and "Now You're Talkin'" were both recorded by Montgomery Gentry on their 2008 album, Back When I Knew It All. The latter was co-written by former Trick Pony bassist Ira Dean.

Track listing
"Long Line of Losers" (Kevin Fowler, Kim Tribble) - 3:43
"Feels Good Don't It" (Fowler, Brandon Kinney, Tracy Martin) - 4:04
"Ain't Dead Yet" (David Lee Murphy, Tribble) - 3:36
"Me and the Boys" (Fowler, Thom Shepherd) - 4:01
featuring George Jones
"I Pulled a Hank Last Night" (Marty Brown, Andy Griggs) - 3:54
"What's Your Point?" (Fowler, Mark McKinney) - 5:09
"Bring It On" (Fowler) - 4:12
"Cheaper to Keep Her" (Bart Butler, Fowler, Shepherd) - 3:13
"Slow Down" (Fowler, Chris Hennessee) - 3:41
"Now You're Talkin'" (Ira Dean, Murphy, Tribble) - 4:00
"Best Mistake I Ever Made" (Fowler, Bobby Pounds) - 3:05
"Let's Start Livin'" (Kent Agee, Fowler) - 3:09
"Honky Tonk Junkie" (Fowler, Clint Ingersoll) - 3:18

Personnel
 Joe Chemay - bass guitar
 Mickey Jack Cones - background vocals
 J.T. Corenflos - electric guitar
 Kevin Fowler - acoustic guitar, lead vocals
 David Grissom - electric guitar
 Owen Hale - drums, percussion
 Tony Harrell - Hammond B-3 organ
 Wes Hightower - background vocals
 Steve Hinson - pedal steel guitar, slide guitar
 George Jones - duet vocals on "Me and the Boys"
 Brent Mason - electric guitar
 Randy McCormick - clavinova, Hammond B-3 organ, piano, Wurlitzer
 Billy Panda - acoustic guitar, mandolin
 Hank Singer - fiddle
 Joe Spivey - fiddle

Chart performance

2007 albums
Kevin Fowler albums
Albums produced by Blake Chancey
Equity Music Group albums